Nelson Felix Balongo Lissondja Vha (born 15 April 1999) is a professional footballer who plays as a forward for ŁKS Łódź. Born in Belgium, he represents the DR Congo internationally.

Club career
On 24 June 2022, it was announced he would join Polish I liga club ŁKS Łódź on a three-year contract.

International career
Born in the Netherlands, Balongo is of Congolese descent. He has represented the DR Congo U20, and the DR Congo U23s.

References

1999 births
Living people
Footballers from Limburg (Belgium)
People from Tongeren
Association football midfielders
Citizens of the Democratic Republic of the Congo through descent
Democratic Republic of the Congo footballers
Democratic Republic of the Congo expatriate footballers
Democratic Republic of the Congo youth international footballers
Belgian footballers
Belgian sportspeople of Democratic Republic of the Congo descent
Standard Liège players
Boavista F.C. players
Sint-Truidense V.V. players
ŁKS Łódź players
Belgian Pro League players
Democratic Republic of the Congo expatriate sportspeople in Portugal
Democratic Republic of the Congo expatriate sportspeople in Poland
Expatriate footballers in Portugal
Expatriate footballers in Poland